The 2018 Judo Grand Prix Agadir was held at Sports Hall Al Inbiaat in Agadir, Morocco, from 9 to 11 March 2018.

Medal summary

Men's events

Women's events

Source Results

Medal table

References

External links
 

2018 IJF World Tour
 2018 Judo Grand Prix
Sport in Agadir
2018 in Moroccan sport